The I Indian Corps was an army corps of the British Indian Army in the World War I. It was formed at the outbreak of war under the title Indian Corps from troops sent to the Western Front. The British Indian Army did not have a pre-war corps structure, and it held this title until further corps were created. It was withdrawn from the Western Front in December 1915 and reconstituted as I Indian Corps in Mesopotamia until the end of the war.

Western Front

In 1914  Indian Expeditionary Force A was sent to reinforce the British Expeditionary Force (BEF) fighting in France. In France it formed the Indian Cavalry Corps and Indian Corps composed of 3rd (Lahore) and 7th (Meerut) Divisions. (In France, these formations were simply known as 'Lahore' and 'Meerut' Divisions, to distinguish them from the 3rd and 7th British divisions.) Despatch from India was delayed by the activities of the German raiders  and  operating in the Indian Ocean, and by the slow speed of the transport vessels. Lahore Division began landing at Marseilles on 26 September 1914, but there were further delays while the troops were re-armed with the latest pattern rifle, and the supply train could be improvised, using tradesmens' vans procured locally. The corps finally got into action at the Battles of La Bassée, 1st Messines and Armentières in October–November 1914.

Order of Battle October–December 1914
General Officer Commanding: Lieut-Gen Sir J. Willcocks, Brig-Gen, General Staff: Brig-Gen H. Hudson, Brig-Gen, Royal Artillery: Brig-Gen H.F. Mercer, Colonel, Royal Engineers: Col H.C. Nanton
 Lahore Division
 Meerut Division
 Divisional Troops (attached from 12 October, left to join Indian Cavalry Corps 23 December 1914)
 9th (Secunderabad) Cavalry Brigade
 Signal Troop
 N Battery Royal Horse Artillery
 H Section Ammunition Column
 1st Indian Field Troop, 1st King George's Own Sappers & Miners
 Jodhpur Lancers (Imperial Service Troops)
 Jodhpur Cavalry Field Ambulance

Operations
 The Battles of La Bassée, 1st Messines and Armentières
 Winter operations 1914–15
 The Battle of Neuve Chapelle
 The Battles of Aubers Ridge and Festubert. At this period the corps was reinforced by 51st (Highland) Division of the Territorial Force in addition to 3rd (Lahore) and 7th (Meerut) divisions.
 The Battle of Loos

Mesopotamia
On 13 August 1915, General Sir John Nixon, commanding Indian Expeditionary Force D in Mesopotamia, requested one of the Indian infantry divisions in France as reinforcements for his advance on Baghdad. Coincidentally, on the same day, the Secretary of State for India, Austen Chamberlain, told the Viceroy of India that he was anxious for the Indian infantry to be withdrawn from France before they had to endure another winter. The system for supplying drafts had broken down and the Indian battalions were becoming very weak after the heavy casualties they had suffered. Although the Secretary of State for War, Lord Kitchener, objected to their withdrawal from the Western Front, orders were issued on 31 October for the two divisions of Indian Corps (3rd (Lahore) and 7th (Meerut) Division) to embark at Marseilles for Mesopotamia. Indian Corps was relieved in the front line on 6 November by XI Corps and the two divisions were due at Basra in December, but their departure from Marseilles was delayed because of fear of submarine attack. 3rd (Lahore) Division finally arrived in Mesopotamia in April 1916 and joined Tigris Corps, too late to relieve 6th (Poona) Division at Kut-al-Amara.

See also 
 Mewar Bhil Corps

Notes

References

External links and further reading

 India and the Western Front, Dr David Omissi, BBC History website
 
 

Corps of British India
Corps of India in World War I
Military units and formations established in 1914
Military units and formations disestablished in 1918